Syed Afsar Madad Naqvi (10 August 193311 January 1997), was a prominent 20th-century's sculptor. He is best known for his pure realistic monumental sculptures which can be seen in many places around the country (such as Roshan Khan/Jahangir Khan Squash Complex, Fleet Club, Arts Council of Pakistan, Markaz-e-Sadaat-e-Amroha Centre, Hasan Square Karachi, Star Gate Karachi, Quaid-e-Azam International Airport, Village Restaurant, Metropol Hotel etc.). Afsar Madad Naqvi was a master Pakistani sculptor and painter. He was a founder member of the Central Institute of Arts and Crafts Karachi.

Early life and education
Afsar Madad Naqvi was born in 1933 at Amroha, India. Diploma and Post-diploma from the Government College of Arts and Crafts, Lucknow, India. Trained under renowned sculptor Mohammad Hanif at Lucknow College of Arts and Crafts in the early 60s.

Career
He was one of the few qualified sculptors who could teach the technique of making life-size armature, simple casting and multiple casting with permanent moulds. He worked with great ease and facility in metals, wood, cement, Plaster of Paris, marble, stone and clay.

He came to Pakistan in 1962 and shortly after that and had a solo show at the Karachi Arts Council Hall, which was also the country's first solo sculpture exhibition. When Mr. Nawabzada Wajid Mehmood founded the Central Institute of Arts and Crafts, he requested him to set up the sculpture studio and he have lived up to this responsibility since then.

Afsar Naqvi was sculptor, traditionalist, loyal friend and affectionate teacher. He had a huge following of artists in Pakistan, most of whom were his students.

His acute observation of detail, timeless dedication to craftsmanship and the innate soul of a master allows him to breathe life into any work of art from delicate pencil sketch to monumental sculptures and that is truly make him one of the world's top artists.

Friend and contemporary to leading artists and literary figures, Afsar Naqvi is a quiet, retiring man and has spent the better part of the last twenty five years teaching sculpture to a generation of artists at the institute. In his work, Sir Naqvi is an exponent of the Eastern idiom. His deep rooted aesthetics of the sub-continental culture bond us to the past. Many art scholar would have us believe that Mughal miniature and folk art are our only heritage when Classical Indian art forms the very core of this region's art history.

He was highly skilled in his craft, his long finger nimbly created small figurines in clay while he carried on with his discussions, as if they had a life of their own. While fame eluded him as a Master Sculptor his skills earned high great respect and his advise was always sought in technical matters, for which he was seldom financially compensated.

Afsar Naqvi's vision and aesthetics was indelibly etched into his own creative expression and his drive to achieve the same level of perfection in his master work.

Biography (by year)
1933 – Born- Amroha, India

1960 – Diploma and Post-diploma- Government College of Arts and Crafts Lucknow, India

1962 – Migration- Pakistan, Karachi

1962 – Joined Central Institute of Art & Crafts, Karachi as Head of Sculpture Department

1963 – Solo Exhibition- Arts Council of Pakistan, Karachi

1969 – Solo Exhibition- Pakistan American Cultural Centre (P.A.C.C.)

1971 – Solo Exhibition- Indus Gallery, Karachi

1975 – Solo Exhibition- Arts Council of Pakistan, Karachi

1985 – Group Exhibition- The Fifth National Arts Exhibition, Idara Saqafat -e- Pakistan

1992 – Joined North City School of Art & Architecture, Karachi as Principle and Head of Fine Art (Sculpture) Department

1995 – Founded Bhittai Institute of Art & Crafts

1997 – Death

1997 – Solo Exhibition – A tribute to Afsar Madad Naqvi, Arts Council of Pakistan, Karachi

Specialization
Specialized in portraiture, mural work, and terra-cotta. He has done lot of masterpiece sculptures in wood, metal, plaster, cement and terra-cotta. Indian Classical sculpture, Naqvi's ability to be able to capture in wood, stone or metal the essence of a narrative moment with a dramatic naturalistic realism.

Notes

External links
 https://web.archive.org/web/20111008221833/http://www.amroha.net.pk/internal/afsar_madad_1.htm
 http://afsarnaqvi.wordpress.com/
 https://web.archive.org/web/20091227053223/http://www.amrohatimes.com/php/personalities.php
 http://fasihuddinqureshi.com/index.htm

1933 births
1997 deaths
People from Amroha
Pakistani Shia Muslims
Muhajir people
Pakistani sculptors
University of Lucknow alumni
Artists from Karachi
20th-century sculptors
20th-century Pakistani painters